The Omaka Aviation Heritage Centre is an aviation museum located at the Omaka Air Field,  from the centre of Blenheim, New Zealand.

History
A resurgence of heritage aviation interest began in the Marlborough area in the late 1990s when a group of enthusiasts imported two Chinese Nanchang CJ-6 trainers and established the Marlborough Warbirds Association as a way to foster interest and provide a social network of support. As increasing numbers of aircraft were based at Omaka, word of their existence led to increasing numbers of tourists visiting the facilities. In 1997, a small group of aircraft owners and enthusiasts established the New Zealand Aviation Museum Trust to provide a means of  making the aircraft accessible to the public on a more practical and sustainable basis while acting as catalyst to attract aviation business and investment to the Marlborough region and at the same time grow the public understanding and appreciation of aviation.

A decade of collaborative activity lead to the establishment of the Marlborough Aviation Cluster, incorporating an aviation business park and the heritage centre.  The initiative received support from the Marlborough District Council and Marlborough Regional Development Trust.  In addition NZ Trade and Enterprise in 2004 contributed NZ$2 million in funding as part of a Major Regional Initiative grant towards stage 1 of the heritage centre.

Stage One of the Omaka Aviation Heritage Centre, featuring the WW1 exhibition 'Knights of the Sky' occupies some 3,000 sqm of purpose-built display area and was officially opened on 9th Dec 2006. 

Stage Two opened in November 2016.

Knights of the Sky Exhibition
Omaka's first exhibition, 'Knights of the Sky', presents one of the world's largest collections of World War I aircraft and rare memorabilia, including a mix of static displays along with flyable planes.  The collection (which is on long term loan to the museum) is managed by the 14-18 Aviation Heritage Trust, which is chaired by film director Sir Peter Jackson. As a result of Jackson’s interest the exhibition which was designed by Joe Bleakley was able to employ the talents of Wellington's finest set builders, painters and props specialists, in particular those of Wingnut Films and enhanced with lifelike mannequins by Weta Workshop. Despite its complexity the exhibition took less than 10 weeks to complete from design to opening.

Dangerous Skies Exhibition
'Dangerous Skies' broadens the Omaka experience into the Second World War. As well as the Battle of Britain, visitors are taken on a journey through the lesser-known stories of the war on the Eastern Front. Like the WW1 'Knights of the Sky', this exhibition features mannequins made by Weta Workshop, and original, static and flyable aircraft in larger than life dioramas.

Airshow
At Easter on alternate (odd) years to the Warbirds over Wanaka air show, the Omaka airfield plays host to an air show called Classic Fighters.

Collection
The museum's collection contains a wide variety of military aircraft from the First and Second World Wars as well as artefacts and personal items belonging to some of the most famous aviators of World War I including some items of Baron Manfred von Richthofen memorabilia.

Aircraft on display

The Omaka Aviation Heritage Centre contains the following:

 Airco DH.2 replica
 Breguet 14 replica
 Caproni Ca.22 Original
 Curtiss MF Flying Boat. Original
 Airco DH.4 Original, built under license in the United States and one of two original examples known to survive.
 De Havilland Mosquito
 Etrich Taube replica
 Focke-Wulf Fw 190A
 Fokker D.VIII
 Fokker Dr.I triplane. Four flyable replicas are maintained.
 Fokker E.III Eindecker replica
 Halberstadt D.IV replica
 Hawker Hurricane. One of several taxiable replicas built for the 1969 film Battle of Britain (film)
 Junkers Ju 87 Stuka replica
 Lockheed Hudson NZ2049
 Messerschmitt Bf 108
 Morane-Saulnier BB
 Nieuport 24 replica
 Nieuport 27 replica
 Pfalz D.III, one of two flying replicas built for use in the movie The Blue Max.
 Royal Aircraft Factory S.E.5a replica built by the Vintage Aviator Ltd.
 Royal Aircraft Factory R.E.8 replica built by the Vintage Aviator Ltd.
 Siemens-Schuckert D.IV replica
 Supermarine Spitfire Mk 14
 Thomas-Morse S-4 Scout original
 Yakovlev Yak-3

Soon to join the collection from the deceased John Smith collection from Māpua, New Zealand:
 de Havilland Tiger Moth NZ1467/ZK-BQB
 Curtiss P-40N Kittyhawk Mk.IV 43-22962/NZ3220  "Gloria Lyons"
 De Havilland Mosquito DH.98 Mosquito FB.VI TE910/NZ2336

See also
 List of aerospace museums
 Warbird

References

External links

 
 

Aerospace museums in New Zealand
Buildings and structures in Blenheim, New Zealand
Military and war museums in New Zealand
Museums in the Marlborough Region
2010s architecture in New Zealand